Hobbe may refer to:

 Hobbe, a diminutive of the given name Robert (name)
 Hobbe Smith (1862-1942) Dutch post-impressionist painter
 Hobbe, the Chief, a playing card in the card game Happy Families
 Father Hobbe, a character from the 2000 Bernard Cornwell Grailquest novels, see Vagabond (novel)
 The Hobbe, a fictional race from the Fable videogame RPG series, see Fable: The Journey

See also

 
 Cyrus Hobbi (born 1993) U.S. American football player
 Robert (disambiguation)
 Hobbie (disambiguation)
 Hobby (disambiguation)
 Hobbes (disambiguation)
 Hobbs (disambiguation)
 Hobb (disambiguation)
 Hob (disambiguation)